De la Beche Bay is an Arctic waterway in Qikiqtaaluk Region, Nunavut, Canada. Located off southern Bathurst Island, the bay is an arm of Viscount Melville Sound. It is entered at Harding Point.

It was named in honor of English geologist Sir Henry De la Beche.

References

Bays of Qikiqtaaluk Region